Jamshed Burjor Pardiwala (born 12 August 1965) is a judge of the Supreme Court of India since May 2022. He is a former judge of the Gujarat High Court.

Early life and career 
Pardiwala was born on 12 August 1965 at Mumbai. He was educated at St. Joseph's E. T. High School, Valsad. He obtained his law degree from K.M. Law College, Valsad in 1988 and started practice at Valsad in 1989. He was elected as a member of the Bar Council of Gujarat from 1994 to 2000. He has also worked as member of Gujarat High Court Legal Services Authority.

Judicial career

Gujarat High Court
Pardiwala was appointed as an additional judge of the Gujarat High Court on 17 February 2011 and was made permanent judge on 28 January 2013. He served in the Gujarat High Court until May 2022. During this period, he has also served as the President of the Gujarat State Judicial Academy.

Supreme Court of India
He was elevated as judge of the Supreme Court of India on 9 May 2022. He was part of the majority of the Constitution bench which upheld the 103rd Constitutional amendment of EWS reservation. He remarked, "Reservation cannot go on for an indefinite period". This judgement of the supreme court has been criticized by some. He is in line to become the Chief Justice of India in May 2028 and is expected to serve for a term of 2 years and 3 months.

References 

1965 births
Living people
21st-century Indian judges
Judges of the Gujarat High Court
Justices of the Supreme Court of India
People from Mumbai